Cobitis puncticulata is a species of ray-finned fish in the family Cobitidae. It is found only in Turkey and Greece. Its natural habitat is rivers. It is threatened by habitat loss.

References

puncticulata
Endemic fauna of Turkey
Fish described in 1998
Taxa named by Teodor T. Nalbant
Taxonomy articles created by Polbot